Mine tossede drenge is a 1961 Danish family film directed by Sven Methling and starring Marguerite Viby.

Cast
 Marguerite Viby - Gerda Henriksen
 Otto Brandenburg - William Henriksen
 Poul Reichhardt - Ernst Henriksen
 Judy Gringer - Nina
 Palle Huld - Alman
 Einar Juhl - Bogholder Thomsen
 Gerda Madsen - Martha
 Lene Christiansen - Susie Henriksen
 Jan Priiskorn-Schmidt - Tom Henriksen
 Volmer Sørensen - Bartender
 Olaf Ussing - Overlæge
 Kirsten Passer - Williams kollega
 Valsø Holm - Bankkunde
 Bjørn Spiro - Tjener
 Ego Brønnum-Jacobsen - Bankkunde
 Christian Brochorst - Arrangør

References

External links

1961 films
Danish children's films
1960s Danish-language films
Films directed by Sven Methling
Nordisk Film films
1960s children's films